Titanic: The Legend Goes On ( or Titanic: La leggenda continua), also released as Titanic: The Animated Movie, is a 2000 Italian animated musical film about the sinking of the RMS Titanic, written and directed by Camillo Teti.

Plot
The story begins on the White Star Line–chartered boat train, which is carrying passengers to the RMS Titanic. A poor girl named Angelica, treated as a servant by her wicked stepmother and two stepsisters, dreams of finding both love and her missing mother, with only a blue locket as a clue to the mother's identity. At the same time, an upper-class English man named William boards with his maid, who laments the loss of her daughter years ago, as well as his secretary Gaston. Other passengers include the gold-digging Winnie, a failing banker named Jeremy McFlannel, a jewel thief named Corynthia Meanstreak, her two henchmen Kirk and Dirk, a detective named Sam Bradbury who has been sent to pursue them, and Molly, a gorgeous singer. Also boarding in the cargo hold are a group of animals, including a family of Yiddish mice, some geese, a rapping dog named Fritz who sings a song called "Party Time", a magpie named Hector, and a band of Mexican mice. Throughout the voyage, the various passengers meet and interact. William and Angelica fall in love at first sight, while Winnie and Jeremy fall for each other after Winnie's dog Flopsy trips him. Gaston meanwhile attempts to woo Molly with Angelica's locket, which he found after she unknowingly dropped it. Sam goes undercover to find Corynthia while Kirk and Dirk make several unsuccessful attempts to steal jewelry from Winnie, but are foiled by her dog.

The film reaches its climax at a reception held in honor of the passengers. Angelica is able to attend with William after her cabinmate Victoria loans her a suitable dress. Meanwhile, the Yiddish mouse child Maxie discovers that Angelica is missing her locket and recruits the other animals to help search for it, finding it in time for her to wear to the reception. Upon seeing the locket being worn by Angelica and hearing the correct implication from one of the ship's officers that it was stolen when she received it, Molly slaps Gaston and leaves him. When Gertrude, Bernice, and Hortense attempt to break up Angelica and William, Maxie scares them off. Kirk and Dirk manage to successfully steal a pearl choker from Winnie, but learn that it is fake, as Winnie is not rich and uses fake jewelry to infatuate wealthy men.

The Titanic hits an iceberg and begins to sink as the passengers rush for the lifeboats. Angelica, Victoria, and Victoria's grandchildren manage to avoid her stepfamily, who have boarded a lifeboat, reunite with William and they lead the steerage passengers to the boat deck. All of the animals escape on floating crates, rescuing the ship's cook in the process and being led to safety by dolphins. Winnie chooses to stay behind with Jeremy, who reveals to her that he is not the rich man she thought he was – he was on his way to America to be bailed out after his bank failed. Despite learning this, Winnie still loves him and they remain on the ship to die together. Molly also chooses to remain behind on the ship, singing with the band, and dies along with them. William grabs a small child to protect them as he falls overboard when the ship breaks in half and sinks beneath the ocean. He puts the child safely in a nearby boat but his foot is trapped in a rope from the ship's stern and he is dragged down with the ship, apparently dying. On one of the lifeboats, Angelica discovers that William's maid is actually her mother and the two are reunited. They come across Sam in the water and pull him aboard. William surfaces (having freed himself from the rope and staying alive underwater) alongside the boat and is reunited with Angelica. An epilogue reveals that the two were married and lived happily ever after, that Detective Sam Bradbury put Corynthia behind bars, Kirk and Dirk married Angelica's stepsisters and Gaston married a wealthy socialite hoping to live off her money but ended up in charge of her home's household chores.

Voice Cast

Italian version
 Francesca Guadagno – Angelica
 Francesco Pezzulli – William
 Valeria Perilli – Gertrude
 Claudia Pittelli – Berenice
 Eliana Lupo – Ortensia
 Stefania Romagnoli – Amalia
 Lucio Saccone – Gaston
 Luigi Ferraro – Kirk
 Diego Reggente – Dirk
 Mino Caprio – Sam
 Stefano Mondini – First Officer Stockard
 Pieraldo Ferrante – Capitano
 Antonella Giannini – Molly
 Letizia Ciampa – Pablito
 Graziella Polesinant – Victoria
 Bobby Solo – Fritz

English  version
 Lisa Russo – Angelica
 Mark Thompson-Ashworth – William
 Caroline Yung – Maxie the Mouse / Swedish Mouse
 Gregory Snegoff – Fritz / Geoffrey
 Giselle Matthews – Gertrude
 Silva Benton – Bernice
 Bianca Alessandra Ara – Hortense
 Veronica Wells – Corynthia
 Clive Riche – Kirk
 Doug Meakin – Dirk
 Jacques Stany – Gaston
 Mickey Knox – Sam
 Edmund Purdom – Jeremy McFlannel
 David Brandon – First Officer Stockard
 Kenneth Belton – Captain Smith
 Pat Starke – Molly
 Jill Tyler – Victoria
 Susan Spifford – Angelica's Mother (uncredited)

Production and release
Titanic: The Legend Goes On was in production for three years. It was released to theaters on 15 September 2000 in Italy, and received a DVD premiere in Canada the following July. The Canadian VHS by Equinox Entertainment (titled Titanic: The Animated Movie) and DVD has since gone out of print, though it has been re-released by Third Millennium Distributions.

English versions
There are two English versions done with the same cast: an uncut dub, and a drastically cut and re-edited dub. The latter one features an altered plot, with entire scenes edited in a different sequence, removed, re-used, or placed before other scenes. While the uncut version is 82-minutes long, this version was shortened to 58 minutes, plus 12 minutes of credits showing some deleted scenes, bringing the runtime to 70 minutes.

Reception
The film was described by Linda Maria Koldau, author of The Titanic on Film: Myth versus Truth, as being "a failed Disney imitation that excels in bad taste." Christopher Campbell of IndieWire wrote that the film was "inappropriate for children" and that "it’s so terribly written and drawn that it’s offensive to the Titanic’s memory." Film critic Tim Brayton of Alternate Ending said it was "Among the most nuttily enjoyable bad movies of the 2000s."

Titanic: The Legend Goes On has appeared on several "worst-ever" lists. British film magazine Total Film named it as the worst film ever made, after it topped a list of the 66 worst films ever in 2012. Total Film also included it on a list of the "50 Worst Kids Movies", noting that it is "Widely considered one of the worst animated movies ever made." Likewise, Spanish film magazine Fotogramas selected it as one of the 20 worst films ever made. Will Roberts of American-based Showbiz Cheat Sheet listed it as the worst animated film ever made, while Screen Rant included it on a list of the twelve worst animated films of all time. It became the lowest-rated film on IMDb's Bottom 100 list in 2012.

See also

 The Legend of the Titanic, another animated film about the Titanic
 List of films about the RMS Titanic
 List of films considered the worst

References

External links
 

2000 animated films
2000 films
Films set in 1912
Italian animated films
Films about RMS Titanic
Seafaring films based on actual events
Films with screenplays by Jymn Magon
Films produced by Jymn Magon
Films scored by Detto Mariano
2000s rediscovered films
Films set in the 1910s
Rediscovered Italian films
2000s English-language films